The Vancouver International Digital Festival is an annual event for creative professionals working in digital media. Held for the last four years in Vancouver, British Columbia, Canada, the event includes an international business partnering forum, industry parties, digital entertainment screenings, conference sessions on the latest trends and markets for digital media, and educational workshops for creators, designers, and producers in games, mobile, animation, film, and interactive design.

Past speakers
Nolan Bushnell, The founder of Atari, Pong Creator, and CEO/Founder of uWink, Inc.
Don Mattrick, president of Electronic Arts
Terry McBride, CEO of the Nettwerk Music Group
George Oates, Principal Designer of Flickr
Mark Pesce, Honorary Associate, University of Sydney and author of The Playful World: How Technology is Transforming Our Imagination
Joshua Davis, Designer, http://www.joshuadavis.com
John Schappert, Senior Vice President and General Manager, Electronic Arts Canada
Sander Schwartz, President of Warner Bros. Animation
Malcolm Garrett, Creative Director, AIG (Applied Information Group)

External links 
VIDFEST 2008
VIDFEST 2007
VIDFEST 2006
VIDFEST 2005
VIDFEST 2004

References 
 Dave Watson, "Digital fest's tractor beam is irresistible," The Georgia Straight. June 8, 2006
 Rob Howatson, "Arthouse Digital Data Burst," Globe and Mail. June 9, 2006
 Jim Jamieson, "Return to roots, says video-game inventor" The Province. June 16, 2006

Festivals in Vancouver
Music conferences